Varlamovo is a rural locality (a village) in Mayskoye Rural Settlement, Vologodsky District, Vologda Oblast, Russia. The population was 10 as of 2002. There are 3 streets.

Geography 
Varlamovo is located 12 km northwest of Vologda (the district's administrative centre) by road. Dmitriyevo is the nearest rural locality.

References 

Rural localities in Vologodsky District